General elections were held in Panama on 8 May 1994, electing both a new President of the Republic and a new Legislative Assembly.

Ernesto Pérez Balladares stood as a candidate for the Democratic Revolutionary Party (PRD), opposing Mireya Moscoso of the Arnulfista Party and the salsa singer Rubén Blades, who was then president of the party Papa Egoro. In the 1989 general election, Pérez Balladares had served as the campaign manager for Carlos Duque, the hand-picked candidate of military ruler Manuel Noriega, and his 1994 opponents sought to emphasize his connection with Noriega, broadcasting pictures of the two together. Pérez Balladares denied the link, describing the current PRD as "diametrically opposed" to Noriega's policies. Instead, he worked to position himself as a successor to Torrijos, who was regarded as a national hero. The incumbent Arnulfista Party, meanwhile, was seen as hobbled by dissatisfaction with the perceived incompetence and corruption of Endara's government. He ultimately won the election with 33% of the vote, with Moscoso receiving 29% and Blades receiving 17%.

The PRD "also achieved an effective majority in the new National Assembly. The big surprise was not the victory of the PRD, but the nearly successful challenge of Mireya Moscoso de Gruber, the candidate of the Arnulfista Party".

Results

President

National Assembly

References

Panama
General
Elections in Panama
Presidential elections in Panama